Archduke Joseph Anton of Austria (9 March 1776 – 13 January 1847) was the 103rd and penultimate palatine of Hungary who served for more than fifty years from 1796 to 1847, after he had been appointed governor in 1795.

The latter half of his service coincided with the Hungarian Reform Era, and he mediated between Francis I, King of Hungary and the Hungarian nobility, representing the country's interests in Vienna. He played a prominent role in the development of Pest as a cultural and economic centre, and the neoclassical buildings constructed on his initiative define the modern appearance of the city. The landscaping of the City Park of Budapest and Margaret Island also happened under his supervision. In the wider country, he supported public education, technical higher education, the arts, the construction of railroads, and the work of various progressive-thinking societies and associations. He made great donations towards the establishment of the Hungarian National Museum, the Hungarian Academy of Sciences, and the National Széchényi Library.

He was an archduke of Austria and a prince of Bohemia, Hungary, and Tuscany as the son of Leopold II, Holy Roman Emperor, and the Hungarian or Palatinal branch of the House of Habsburg-Lorraine descends from him. In the Imperial Army, and later in the Austro-Hungarian Army, he bore the rank of Feldmarschall.

Early life and education

Childhood in Tuscany 

Archduke Joseph Anton Johann Baptist of Austria was born on 9 March 1776 in Florence, Grand Duchy of Tuscany as the ninth child and seventh son of Leopold I, Grand Duke of Tuscany and Infanta Maria Luisa of Spain. He had a total of fifteen siblings, two of whom died in infancy. Through his father, he was a grandson of Maria Theresa, Holy Roman Empress Dowager, Queen Regnant of Bohemia and Hungary. The family lived in the Palazzo Pitti in Florence, but spent summers in the Villa del Poggio Imperiale or the Villa di Poggio a Cajano, and some winters in Pisa.

The grand duchal couple created a warm, intimate environment for their children. They raised them according to the modern principles of the age, paying special attention to their diet and regular physical exercise. Their education plan was a mix of old-fashioned courtly instruction focused on etiquette and royal duty and the newer ideas of Locke and Rousseau. Until they turned four, the children were entrusted to an all-female staff composed of German-, Italian-, and French-speaking women who were only allowed to use their respective mother tongues with them. Instruction in reading and writing started at the age of three, and regular language classes a year later. As the children's grandmother, Empress Dowager Maria Theresa—who monitored their development closely—wanted, the family's life revolved around the strict observance of all Catholic rituals. The children listened to religious texts while getting ready in the morning, attended mass, studied the catechism, and prayed the rosary every day.

It was the shared aim of Grand Duke Leopold and Count Colloredo to teach the children to lead a simple life, be humble, dutiful, and devoted to the well-being of their subjects. In their learning, they were taught to be inquisitive and independent. There were some disagreements between the grand duke and the ajo, as the former wanted his children to lead as free and unrestricted lives as possible, while the latter expected them to be graceful, serious, and disciplined beyond their years. Archduke Joseph himself was only under Colloredo's guidance for two and a half years, and when he left in 1782, Major Manfredini was promoted to ajo. He allowed his charges more freedom.

The preparatory stage of Joseph's education lasted until the age of nine, by when he had learned to speak and write in German, French, Italian, and Latin. He received the traditional education of Austrian archdukes, learning etiquette and conduite (the behaviour expected in high society), genealogy, geography, history, ethics, law, natural law, political science, and mathematics. Joseph had a preference for history, archaeology, and natural history, and was not as apt in mathematics. It was important for his parents that all of their children learned some form of manual labour, and Joseph was instructed in gardening, botany, and horticulture. He learned the binomial nomenclature and taxonomy of over six thousand plants.

The teacher who had the greatest impact on the children was Count Sigismund Anton von Hohenwarth, an ex-Jesuite who later became prince-archbishop of Vienna. His pedagogical philosophy was based on Enlightenment ideas, and he taught the archdukes that a person's true vocation was to strive for the happiness of themselves and others, which could only be achieved in a society. He analysed with them examples of good and bad statesmanship, focusing on the importance of institutions, legislation, education, the sciences, the arts, and different aspects of the economy. He provided taught them to objectively assess all matters.

Youth in Vienna 
Archduke Joseph's father, Grand Duke Leopold was heir presumptive to the thrones of his brother, Joseph II, Holy Roman Emperor, who had no surviving children. When he died in 1790, Leopold and his family moved to Vienna, where Joseph and his brothers arrived on 13 May. With his approaching fifteenth birthday, the final, three-year stage of his education started, focused on military training and political science, including subjects such as politics, investigative history, and law, which he learned from Hofrat ('Court Councillor') . He and his brothers travelled a lot and inspected different institutions, recording their experiences in diaries.

First visit to Pest-Buda 
In 1792, sixteen-year-old Joseph lost both of his parents in three months, and his eldest brother, Francis, became emperor-king. Joseph accompanied him to his coronations in Frankfurt, Prague, and Buda, where he spent twenty-seven days. He met leaders of the country, spending the most time with the prince-primate, Prince-Archbishop of Esztergom, but also seeing Judge Royal  (1753–1826) and Chancellor  (1735–1816). He preferred Pest to Buda.

Visit to the Austrian Netherlands 
In 1794, Joseph went on his second trip, this time to the Austrian Netherlands, which the Habsburg monarchy had temporarily regained during the French Revolutionary Wars. After being present at his brother's swearing-in in Brussels, he studied the culture and economy of the country. From 14 April to 31 May, he was on the battlefield and witnessed one minor win and multiple losses. He always analysed the tactics of both the Imperial Army and the French Revolutionary Army, and drew caricatures of imperial military leaders.

Death of Archduke Alexander Leopold 
When Joseph's father became king of Hungary in 1790, he re-established the office of palatine, which had been vacant since 1765. The Diet of Hungary elected one of his younger sons, fourth-born Archduke Alexander Leopold. In 1795, he uncovered and repressed a conspiracy by the  led by Ignác Martinovics (1755–1795). He then joined his family for a holiday in Laxenburg castles, where he planned to surprise his younger sister Amalia with a display of fireworks on her name day. As an enthusiastic pyrotechnician, he prepared the explosives himself.

On 10 July, the day of the planned festivities, between 12 and 1 pm, something caught fire, causing all of the prepared rockets and the remaining gunpowder to explode. His brother Charles rushed to the rescue with servants, but they struggled to break down the door. This delay was probably what led to Alexander Leopold's death. He was found lying unconscious on the floor, his neck, back, and arms covered in burns from his clothes that had caught fire. He soon regained conscience and lived for another 40 hours in terrible agony, before passing away on 12 July.

Governor of Hungary

Background 
The death of Alexander Leopold was greatly mourned by progressive Hungarian nobles, who had hoped that he would help them establish a constitutional monarchy. Conspiracy theories emerged, claiming that the late palatine had wanted to seize the crown for himself with the help of Judge Royal , and the Viennese court had him murdered for this reason. A , Count , főispán of Békés and Ugocsa Counties told the king that it would be wise to allow for the election of another member of the imperial family to calm tensions. Moson County proposed Albert, Duke of Teschen, the king's uncle-in-law, who had served as governor of Hungary from 1765 to 1781, others would have preferred Archduke Charles who became popular with his military successes in the French Revolutionary Wars, and Count Teleki himself suggested Joseph. Although on 18 July Emperor-King Francis asked for more time to prepare an election, on the 20th he appointed Joseph governor of Hungary.

The appointment of a governor instead of a palatine was seen as a step back on the road of constitutional development and a major win for the reactionary party of the Hungarian nobility led by Baron József Izdenczy. These circles had painted a grim picture of Hungary to the king, convincing him that a rebellion was imminent. While Francis had already decided that he would not gather the diet again because of the Martinovics uprising now Izdenczy's party hoped to abolish the office of palatine. Still, to avoid upsetting progressive circles, the baron advised the king to give more power to Joseph than that of the previous governor, so that his position would be more similar to that of a palatine. Thus, Joseph was not welcomed with unequivocal enthusiasm, especially because many of the highest office holders were replaced at the same time, which seemingly signalling a regime change.

Before he was sent to Buda, the new governor received an education in Hungarian law from the Josephinist canon lawyer György Zsigmond Lakics, chosen by Izdenczy. He also received instructions from King Francis, advising him to 'keep [his] house in order, manage it well, [...] treat [his] entourage humanely and [to not] tolerate intrigue'. He suggested that he travel around Hungary to get to know his new subjects while avoiding spending too much on this tour. Overall, he reminded him that his first duty would be justice to his people.

Archduke Joseph entered Buda on 19 September 1795, heading a procession among a cheering crowd and marching under triumphal archs. On the 21st, he was inaugurated as főispán of Pest-Pilis-Solt-Kiskun County, followed by mass in Matthias Church, a lunch hosted by Prince-Primate Battyhány with six hundred guests and a ball at night. On the next day, he took his seat as president of the governing council. He continued studying Hungarian history and law from Lakics, and started learning the language from  who had participated in the Hungarian Jacobin movement.

Work as governor 
The first case he needed to take on was that of eight university and secondary school teachers who had allegedly been associated with Imre Martinovics and freemasonry. The ongoing investigation brought on allegations such as one of them translating La Marseillaise, organising gatherings with convicted freemasons and Martinovics co-conspirators, or teaching pantheism. The king ordered an investigation, which was not in the interest of János Németh, head of the Royal Directorate and close ally of Izdenczy, as he lacked substantial proof. Thus, he persuaded Joseph to propose to the king the dismissal of five of the accused teachers, which Francis accepted. His biographer Domanovszky writes that in this first matter, which he had to solve only three weeks after arriving in Buda, the governor did not seem to have a mind of his own yet and relied entirely on a referral he had received from Németh.

The other important issue Joseph needed to settle in his first year in Hungary was that of the Royal University of Pest. Since 1790, there had been plans to move it to a smaller city, namely Nagyszombat (today Trnava, Slovakia), Esztergom, Vác, or Eger. In 1794, these cities urged their respective counties to reach an agreement, while Pest tried to keep the institution. Most of the clerical elite, the conservative aristocrats, and the gentry's deputies wanted to see it removed. On 23 October 1795, the referral reached the governing council. The governor himself followed entirely the public opinion.

The first problem he solved on his own was an outbreak of plague in Syrmia County, worsened by hurried and inconsistent countermeasures. Joseph ordered a lockdown of the infected area, leading to a revolt by the population of two villages who let out their quarantined neighbours and attempted to break through the cordon sanitaire, protected from the outside by armed civilians from the nearby uninfected villages and supervised by the military. The governor appealed for an arms shipment to the martial council in Vienna, which generally opposed arming civilians in fear of a rebellion. Joseph stood his ground, obtaining the necessary weapons after negotiations, and prevented the disease from spreading to other parts of the country.

Besides these larger matters, the king mainly occupied Joseph with policing dissenters and uncovering suspected conspiracies. In smaller debates on religious tolerance (which he enforced despite being a devout Catholic), wine export (which he supported), or giving refuge to French priests (which he refused to do as he feared that they would be too much of a burden and keep local priests from advancing), he proved to be a level-headed and caring leader.

Palatine of Hungary

Palatinal election 
Contrary to the hopes of the reactionary party, most members of the aristocracy and the gentry wanted to see Archduke Joseph as elected palatine, a view that was only strengthened when they met him personally. However, the body to elect the palatine was the Diet of Hungary, which Emperor-King Francis had no intention of allowing.  As he needed the assistance of Hungarians in fighting the French Revolutionary Wars he could eventually be convinced to gather a diet with the sole purpose of electing a palatine. After much negotiation, during which the governor tried to convince the king that a diet and a palatine were necessary to afford the required aid with Izdenczy argued against him, Francis conceded to Joseph. On 8 November 1796, the diet had its first session in Pozsony (today Bratislava, Slovakia), Archduke Joseph was elected palatine on 12 November and inaugurated on the 14th.

Work as palatine

1796–1802 
After his election as palatine, Joseph assumed a more active role in Hungary. While previously he had mostly relied on the opinions and decisions of Izdenczy's ultra-conservative party and supported the removal of progressive teachers accused of corrupting the youth, he now realised that their investigation lacked real proof and was not conducted in a professional way. He heavily criticised this to the Viennese court and reprimanded Németh.

Economic considerations first appeared in Archduke Joseph's letters in early 1796. In early February, he alerted Emperor-King Francis to the devastation that the loss of the Polish market for Hungarian wine caused after Poland had been partitioned two times. His proposal that the emperor-king should help out wine trade was his first individual idea, but was rejected as Vienna wanted to maintain the economic dominance of the Habsburg hereditary lands. In early September, while the sovereign continued to demand soldiers and ammunition from Hungary for the ongoing war, the palatine relayed the nobility's wish for a diet, which was fervently opposed by the court. This might have been what ultimately convinced Joseph that Vienna was partial against Hungary and many of their decisions were made on biased grounds.

During these first years of his palatinate, the majority of the archduke's time was taken up by preparations for the war, equipping and training Hungarian soldiers. In early 1797, after many military failures, Emperor-King Francis sent his family to Buda for their safety. Around this time, a shift can be observed in the tone of the letters exchanged by the brothers: Joseph stopped simply executing Francis' will and became the more pro-active one. Still, he remained conservative in his thinking and worried that the ideas of Enlightenment thinkers could 'confuse' the less-educated. He warned the emperor to keep an eye on returning prisoners of war who might have picked up revolutionary ideas in France. In early 1798, he suggested the establishment of a police force against the 'strong advance of the revolutionary spirit' and proposed a secret police to keep an eye on bigger cities. These ideas had already been brought up during the reign of Joseph II but were too fiercely opposed by the nobility. While a secret police was established to monitor the mood in ten cities, there is no proof of the palatine ever collaborating with them.

Effect of first two visits to Russia 
A major turning point in Archduke Joseph's attitude towards his office were his travels to the Russian Empire. In 1798 and 1799, he visited Saint Petersburg twice to finalise marriage plans with Emperor Paul I's daughter. During the negotiations, he suffered many humiliations because of the diplomatic mistakes of the Viennese court, which led to him to view his brother's administration with a more critical eye. Prior to 1798, he mostly served to execute imperial will in Hungary, and during his short first marriage, he worked little. After the loss of his beloved wife, though, when his focus shifted towards public matters again, he approached them very differently than before, with an opinion of his own.

Already on 9 June 1801, the day after his daughter's birth and death, he wrote a referral to his brother asking him to release the remaining political prisoners of the Martinovics uprising, including author and language reformer Ferenc Kazinczy. He also urged the emperor to gather a diet, allow a reform of public education, establish a second university, and boost trade. He was concerned what a 'relatively sparse population'  the 'vast, abundant area' of Hungary supported (different estimations give between 8,1 and 9 million inhabitants for an area of 282,870 km2/109,220 sq mi in 1790) and at what a 'backwards stage of culture, among what primitive economic conditions' these people lived.

The report of 1801 
On 17 June 1801, Joseph submitted a report to Emperor-King Francis, explaining his view and opinions on Hungary. He characterised public opinion and morale as mostly high, save for a few 'atheistic and freethinking' young people. While he was mostly satisfied with the work of priests, he would have preferred to have less parishes but all of them with good pastors. He criticised members of the aristocracy for not striving for knowledge and useful occupations, that few of them ran for public office and most of these people neglected their high calling. He proposed that in the future, only those should be promoted to the rank of chamberlain or court councillor who had proved themselves in public office. Joseph also emphasised the importance of the lower nobility and that the court should show more appreciation towards them. In detailing his view on all classes of Hungarian society, he was the most dissatisfied with the bureaucracy, faulting them for a lack of zeal and diligence and not keeping classified information secret. His proposed solutions focused not on oppressing opposition but on maintaining the country's good spirits by allowing a diet.

The diet of 1802

Background 
During the French Revolutionary Wars, Archduke Charles, Joseph's brother and leader of the Imperial Army, planned a major reform of military training and service, and demanded recruits and money from Hungary. This could only be afforded by the diet, and the Viennese court was afraid that the nobility would bring up their many complaints if one was gathered. Joseph worked hard to convince his brother to allow this, and he presented his arguments in his report of June 1801. Two days after he handed in the paper, on 19 June, he asked the Francis to declare the time and place of the diet, proposing March 1802 and Buda. He also suggested that the sovereign solve some of the problems the Hungarian nobility ahead of the diet, such as re-attaching Dalmatia to Hungary, or allowing a free export of grain (that had been forbidden to keep the enemy French from acquiring it) to boost the economy. The pressing situation of the Imperial Army in the ongoing war finally led to the Viennese court accepting that the diet needed to be consulted, but in May and in Pozsony.

Despite tragedies in his personal life (the death of his infant daughter and then of his wife in early 1801), as well problems with his physical health, he worked hard to prepare the assembly, battling the reluctance of the emperor and his ministers who were unwilling to compromise. They especially pushed back on helping the Hungarian economy in any way and on the idea of re-attaching Dalmatia. They also refused to consider any educational reforms and held that this was to be decided by the monarch without consulting the nobility. The Viennese legislature thought that Hungary did not contribute proportionally to the Habsburg monarchy, while many Hungarians criticised the government for holding back opportunities for industrial development.

The diet 
After a first session on 6 May, the Diet of 1802 was ceremoniously opened on the 13th, with multiple members of the Habsburg dynasty present. In his opening speech, Joseph aligned himself more with Hungarians than with his own dynasty, promising to protect the country's rights if the emperor-king tried to infringe upon them. He also heavily emphasised the importance of 'complete trust' in the sovereign.

The main goals of the diet was to achieve legislation that helped the agricultural and industrial development of Hungary, stifled by the customs regulations of Maria Theresa and Joseph II. Many cities, towns, and guilds compiled proof and wrote explanations of why the existing system was unjust and unsustainable, asking for a more equal treatment of all parts of the Habsburg monarchy in terms of economic regulations.

Skerlecz stated that the main goal of Austrian customs regulations was to prevent the foundation of factories in Hungary and to almost entirely exclude Hungarian merchants from international trade. Another economist supporting a major reform was Gergely Berzeviczy. He wrote a detailed argument endorsing the deputies' goals and recommendations, including rebuttals against accusations made by the Viennese government which claimed that it was the laziness and primitiveness of Hungarians that kept the country from being as useful in the Habsburg monarchy as possible. In summary, the Hungarians wanted a more independent economy, free from the 'shackles' put on it by previous sovereigns. Despite their efforts, the Austrians were dismissive, and Emperor-King Francis had already committed himself to the old regulations.

Another problem raised at the diet was that of banknotes, which had been used since 1762. The acceptance of banknotes as a form of payment by all was made compulsory in 1800. As a result of government debt, inflation was also concerning. Already before the diet, the palatine had alerted the king that the Hungarian nobles would bring up these issues. Given how serious the monarchy's troubles were and how distrusftul the Viennese legislation and the Hungarian nobility were of each other, the prospects's of the diet seemed bleak. One likely possibility was that the more enlightened proposals would cause the Austrian party to become antagonistic in defence, strengthening the reactionary and absolutist factions in Vienna. This would have made all necessary reforms impossible.

Despite these signs of probable failure, the young palatine worked hard, studying previous negotiations between the two parties. When he learned that the főispáns of each county were commanded to submit the instructions given to their respective envoys to the Austrian chancellery, he was deeply concerned that this would cause distrust among Hungarians. He also gave frequent descriptions of public sentiment to the emperor-king, telling him that while most people deemed the royal demands just and necessary, opinions differed on methods of execution. To elevate spirits, some members of the imperial family moved to Pozsony for the time of the assembly, and various feasts and religious ceremonies were held.

As a result of private meetings among them, the sentiments of the envoys with more extreme opinions were consolidated by the time they presented their ideas before the diet, and initial negotiations seemed to be promising. However, the royal propositions of 13 May, which did not mention any of the subjects that concerned the Hungarians but asked for new recruits and higher taxes. On the 21st, the nobles asked for time to discuss the demands and asked for economic reforms to ease the introduction of higher taxes. Emperor-King Francis received their referral well, and it seemed that the efforts of Archduke Joseph would result in a smoother process. However, conservative and anti-constitutional circles in Vienna raised concerns about the assembly debating the emperor-king's proposals in any way, and while negotiations were peaceful and well-intentioned, both parties remained unwilling to compromise. During the following talks, Joseph often played the role of mediator and calmed the Hungarians, who worried that the Viennese court wanted to inroduce continual recruitment to render diets unnecessary.

Tensions were increased considerably by a formal royal letter on 12 July, which heavily emphasised royal prerogatives on the counsel of Archduke Charles. From this, the envoys deduced that the king did not want to respect their right to allow new taxes and recruits. On 18 July, a report to Archduke Charles described the mood of participants as confused and withdrawn. To avoid further escalation, Joseph decided to personally talk to Francis in early August. He described how determined the envoys were to achieve their goals and that they represented the general opinion of Hungary, and he openly told the king that if Vienna insisted on the content of the letter of 12 July, the situation would deteriorate beyond help. He also expressed his support for some of the economic concerns of the assembly. As a result, a new royal letter on 14 August focused more on achieving consensus and stated that all decisions would only be effective until the next diet. In a separate, confidential letter, the sovereign entrusted the palatine with settling matters 'favourably for the state', giving guidelines.

By this time, however, participating nobles had become distrustful of the king and insisted on all of their previous demands, despite Joseph trying to convince them to compromise. Eventually, he told the envoys that if they did not accept his mediation he would advise the emperor to refuse all of their requests. In response to this threat the diet voted to allow for twelve thousand new recruits and promised to find a final solution for continual recruitment on the next diet. The upcoming Diet of 1804 did not deliver on these promises and was entirely inconsequential, with some development towards making Hungarian the official language of the country (instead of Latin).

It seemed that Joseph had grown tired of the assembly by mid-August, and he soon asked the emperor-king to settle some minor issues and end the diet. In the end, economic reforms were never even seriously considered, especially because the issue was brought up on 14 July, the same day the badly received royal letter of the 12nd was read to the envoys. After more peaceful negotiations during September, the emperor-king's hesitance to re-attach Modruš-Rijeka County meant that the diet ended in distrust and pessimism in October. To the palatine, King Francis wrote that the Hungarian nobles 'only want gains for themselves, without looking to the good of the whole' and that he would need 'great resignation' to forget their 'behaviour against [him]'.

Third journey to Russia 
Since Archduke Joseph had developed a warm relationship with the Russian imperial family and especially his former mother-in-law Empress Dowager Maria Feodorovna, his brother relied on his help in keeping the Russians allied during the Napoleonic Wars. In December 1802, the empress dowager invited Joseph to Saint Petersburg. He arrived on 30 March, and found the imperial court broken up into three factions around the Emperor Alexander I, Empress Consort Elizabeth Alexeievna, and the dowager empress. Joseph joined the dowager's circles. While he tried to seem neutral, all eyes were on him and his inclinations soon became public knowledge.

During his stay, he ate lunch with the emperor almost every day and spent the afternoons with him. Alexander honestly disclosed many of his opinions and worries, which Joseph reported back to Vienna. Still, he enjoyed the company of the empress dowager and Grand Duchesses Maria and Catherine Pavlovna more, spending evenings with them. Joseph's preference for the dowager's faction displeased the Russian court, especially when he declined to embark on a tour of the country with the emperor. They found the fact that he ignored the empress consort's sister, Princess Amalia of Baden even more offensive, as the imperial couple wished him to marry her. When it became obvious that he was not interested in the princess, it was unclear why he had even travelled to Saint Petersburg. Sensing these tensions, the archduke's Hofmeister János Szapáry urged him to return to Buda, and even asked Emperor Francis to order him back under some pretense. Joseph himself refused to even consider leaving. Eventually, after the imperial family tried to pressure him into marrying Princess Amalia, he decided to leave in June, and he spent his last few weeks in Pavlovsk as the empress dowager's guest. Once he had returned to Vienna, he honestly described the foreign opinion on the Habsburg monarchy to Emperor Francis and urged him to be more pro-active in his governing.

Other achievements 
During the decades of his palatinate, Archduke Joseph continued to mediate between his dynasty and the Hungarian people. He tried to moderate and unify the latter, especially at the Diet of 1832–1836. Then, he persuaded the House of Magnates to not veto the proposals of the House of Representatives. In 1840, he obtained imperial amnesty for Hungarian progressives László Lovassy, Lajos Kossuth, and Miklós Wesselényi, who had been persecuted for their opinions.

Hungarian education 
In 1802, Joseph supported the establishment of a national library, which would later develop into the National Széchényi Library and the Hungarian National Museum. He contributed valuable codices and books to its collection. In 1826, he founded the National Royal Joseph Institute and School of the Blind, today the National Institute for the Blind. In 1835, he participated in founding of The Royal Hungarian Ludovica Defense Academy (today ) to provide training for cadets.

On the Diet of 1825, which was gathered after a break of thirteen years on Joseph's insistence, the Hungarian Academy of Sciences was established, to which he contributed ten thousand forints. In 1846, he founded the Royal Joseph Polytechnic, predecessor of today's Budapest University of Technology and Economics.

Transportation and economy 
For the development of Hungarian transportation, he first founded the Kőbánya horsecar line in 1827–28, then the first train line of the country between Pest and Vác. In this, he collaborated with Count István Széchenyi.

Remodelling of Pest 
The first mention of Archduke Joseph's plans to elevate Pest, a neglected town into a modern European city is from 16 November 1804, when he wrote to the city leadership telling them that the sovereign himself wanted Pest to be regulated and improving, although there is no proof of the king being interested in this matter. In this role, he proposed and oversaw the construction of Lipótváros and that of the City Park, which he supplied with trees from his own private park in Alcsút. In 1815, he supported the building of a new, more modern  on Gellért Hill. He also bought Margaret Island, and turned it into a well-kept park. When the  devastated Pest-Buda, he personally directed the rescue mission and did much to relieve those affected.

Personal life

First marriage

Background 

In 1798, Joseph learned from Emperor-King Francis that he needed to marry a member of the Russian imperial family in order to secure Emperor Paul I as an ally in the French Revolutionary Wars. The proposed bride was fifteen-year-old Grand Duchess Alexandra Pavlovna, Paul's eldest daughter. There had been talks that she might marry Archduke Charles instead, but there was a bigger age difference between them, and Francis thought that Joseph was better suited for the match. The Russian court also preferred him. In January 1799, Joseph left for Saint Petersburg travelling under the pseudonym 'Count Burgau', and arrived on 20 February (O.S.). He was warmly welcomed and hugged by the emperor and then presented to the empress and the grand duchesses. The archduke was enchanted by the charm and 'reserved modesty' of Alexandra Pavlovna, a tall blonde girl, whom he described as 'well-built and very beautiful', as well as clever and talented. In a letter to his brother Francis, he declared their meeting the 'happiest moment of [his] life' and Alexandra a noble princess with whom he would be happy.

Alexandra Pavlovna's mother was Empress Maria Feodorovna, but until the age of thirteen, her education was supervised by her grandmother Catherine the Great. She received instruction in French, German, music, and drawing with her younger sister Elena Pavlovna, with whom she was very close. She was a diligent student and talented in the arts. She had been intended to marry King Gustav IV Adolf of Sweden who did not go to the engagement party where then-thirteen-year-old Alexandra Pavlovna was waiting in a bridal dress. The Russians insisted that the future queen be allowed to keep her Orthodox religion, which the Swedish refused to accept, and the engagement came to nothing.

Joseph asked for Alexandra Pavlovna's hand in marriage from her parents on 22 February (O.S.) in her presence, and they gave their blessing. On the betrothal ceremony, the bride wore  and the engagement rings were exchanged by the emperor himself. He spent another month in Saint Petersburg and left on 20 March to assume a role of military leadership. A faction headed by Baron Johann Amadeus von Thugut conspired to replace Archduke Charles with Joseph, which he himself did not support. These plans came to nothing as Emperor-King Francis was too indecisive to enter an open conflict with his popular brother. Thus, Joseph was eventually not appointed, nullifying his reason for leaving Russia so soon and evoking the distrust of Emperor Paul, who would have liked to have seen his future son-in-law lead the Imperial Army.

Joseph arrived in Buda on 13 May and started to prepare for his wife's arrival, re-decorating the apartments of Buda Castle and gathering female courtiers. He urged his brother the emperor to designate a day for the wedding, but Francis did not answer any of his letters until 19 August. Meanwhile, Emperor Paul seemed to have become disillusioned with the alliance, so Joseph was sent back to Russia to sway him, and the wedding date was finally announced as 30 October.

Arriving on 15 October in the Great Gatchina Palace, he was initially welcomed warmly, but after news of lost battles arrived (which were blamed on Baron von Thugut), the emperor refused to talk to him. The Viennese court further complicated the situation by demanding that the Roman Catholic wedding precede the Orthodox one, and be celebrated by the archbishop of Lemberg (today Lviv, Ukraine) who was not yet in Russia. The emperor was angered by the idea of postponing the ceremony, and everyone was greatly relieved when the archbishop arrived on 26 October. The Austrians then had to accept that the Orthodox ceremony will be first. On the 29th, Joseph visited the emperor without announcement, asking for his blessing and committing himself to solving their diplomatic issues openly and honestly. This made a great impression on Paul and the wedding could proceed according to plans.

Marriage 
On 30 October, after Emperor Paul had awarded Joseph the Order of Saint Andrew, he could finally marry Alexandra Pavlovna. The wedding was first celebrated according to Orthodox rites in the imperial chapel of Gatchina Palace, then the Roman Catholic ceremony was held. The following days were overshadowed by news of lost battles and subsequent tension between Austria and Russia, as well as disagreements over the specifics of the dowry and the dower. The emperor again refused to see his son-in-law, but reconciled with him shortly before the young couple's departure on 2 December, which was very emotional. After a visit to Vienna, they arrived in Buda on 11 February. Nevertheless, the Austro-Russian alliance soon fell apart as Emperor Paul pulled out.

During the course of the short marriage, the couple lived happily and enjoyed each other's company. There were many festivities thrown for and by the new archduchess, including concerts, balls, hunts, and a harvest festival on Margaret Island, to which she usually wore Hungarian-style dresses. The couple rode and walked around Buda in a carriage, once finding the village of Üröm, which Alexandra liked so much that Joseph bought it for her, planning to build a summer residence there. Towards the end of her pregnancy, Alexandra often visited Üröm. She enjoyed Hungarian folk music and talked to delegations of tóts (old name for Roman Catholic South Slavs living in Hungary) in a mix of Russian and Slovak. For Joseph's birthday in 1800, she commissioned Haydn to conduct his oratorio The Creation and also invited Beethoven to perform in Budapest.

As a result of her kindness and consideration, Alexandra became so well-liked by Hungarians that they started to call her magyar királyné ('Hungarian queen consort'), much to the dismay of the Viennese court and especially Empress Theresa (who was, in fact, queen consort of Hungary). Whenever the palatinal couple visited Vienna, Alexandra was humiliated in many small ways, and they were not accommodated in the palace with the rest of the imperial family but in a remote house in the garden.

Pregnancy, birth of daughter, and death 
Alexandra soon became pregnant. While the first stages were easy, she developed a fever two days before giving birth. On 8 March 1801, early in the morning a daughter was born after prolonged labour, but she was reportedly 'very weak' and died within the day, possibly the hour. Her casket was inscribed with the same name. She was buried in the Capuchin church in the presence of many Hungarian dignitaries. In 1838, she was transferred to the Palatinal Crypt with the urns containing the intestines and heart of her mother. A later investigation determined that the remains were those of a fully and normally developed newborn, not at all 'very weak', and thus concluded that she probably died of hypoxia during the long delivery.

The death of the baby devastated both parents, but at first it seemed like Alexandra would recover. Despite being treated by four excellent doctors, her condition did not improve, and the breast milk she could not nurse with apparently worsened the fever. From 12 March, she was treated against typhoid fever, and early on the 15th, she became delirious, dying on 16 March. Emperor-King Francis ordered a mourning period of six weeks for the court, with some modifications because of the late archduchess' different religion.

The embalmed body was laid on an ornate catafalque in the Russian Orthodox chapel built for Alexandra's personal use. It lay in state for three days before being placed in a separate building in the garden for six weeks as Orthodox customs commanded. Alexandra was buried on 12 May at noon in the Capuchin Church, her clothes were remade for clerical usage and Joseph gifted her mineral collection the Royal University of Pest eight years later.

On 17 March, Joseph went to Vienna, then travelled around Italy. She was reburied there in 1803, and, after multiple exhumations and disturbances, is there as of 2022. After a grave robbery in the late 1980s, an investigation was carried out, determining that Alexandra Pavlovna suffered and probably died of tuberculosis. The examinations ruled out the possibility of poisoning, rumours of which surfaced in the years following her death.

Marriage plans after Alexandra Pavlovna's death 

In early 1803, Archduke Joseph visited his late wife's family on his former mother-in-law's invitation. It was clear that part of the reason for the invitation was to arrange a new marriage for him. Empress Elizabeth Alexeievna wanted him to wed her older sister, Princess Amalia of Baden, a plan supported by the new emperor, Alexander I. Amalia was known for her kindness and goodness but not her beauty, and Joseph was not attracted to her, deciding early on that he would refuse her. For her part, the princess did not like Joseph's personality. Empress Elizabeth persuaded Empress Dowager Maria to try to convince the archduke to marry Amalie, as she had great influence over him. Joseph did not want to offend his mother-in-law, and waited for weeks before openly rejecting the idea.

During his stay, he grew attached to his fifteen-year-old sister-in-law, Grand Duchess Catherine Pavlovna, who had been promised to Electoral Prince Ludwig of Bavaria. However, he knew how strict the Orthodox church was about keeping incest laws prohibiting marriage between siblings-in-law, and thus did not formally propose.

Some time later, the palatine considered Princess Charlotte of Saxe-Hildburghausen, daughter of Frederick, Duke of Saxe-Hildburghausen, as his fiancée when her engagement to Grand Duke Konstantin Pavlovich of Russia had just been broken off, but there is no further information on why this plan never materialised. In November 1803, there were some signs that the emperor might agree to the marriage between his sister Catherine and the palatine, who then asked Empress Dowager Maria and received a final negative answer. In 1804, he attempted to find a bride from Bavaria, but decided not to risk proposing because of French disapproval.

The archduke would see Grand Duchess Catherine Pavlovna two more times: first, in 1809, when she travelled through Hungary on her way to marry Duke George of Oldenburg. The palatine escorted her through the country. In 1815, by when Catherine Pavlovna herself had also been widowed, they met again at the Congress of Vienna. Contemporary rumour suspected that the two would now revisit their old marriage plans, but there were no signs of this. Archduke Joseph married someone else that year, and Catherine married King William I of Württemberg and died in 1819.

Second marriage 

After fourteen years of widowhood, with the Napoleonic Wars over, Joseph decided to remarry in 1815. On 30 August 1815, in the Schaumburg Castle, he married Princess Hermine of Anhalt-Bernburg-Schaumburg-Hoym, the seventeen-year-old eldest daughter of the late Victor II, Prince of Anhalt-Bernburg-Schaumburg-Hoym and Princess Amelia of Nassau-Weilburg. The bride, twenty-two years younger than the groom, was from a small German state and practiced Calvinism. She became an active and well-liked nádorné ('wife of the palatine'), especially popular among Protestants. In 1817, she founded the first charitable women's association ('nőegyesület') in Hungary. On 14 September 1817, she prematurely gave birth to twins, Hermine and Stephen. The labour was very complicated, and Hermine died of postpartum infections within twenty-four hours.

Joseph was not present for the birth as it was only expected in October, and he went to welcome his mother-in-law to Hungary. The devastating 1838 flood damaged the crypt and carried away the urns containing her heart and intestines but left the casket intact. Afterwards, Joseph obtained an ecclesiastical license to transfer Hermine's remains to the Palatinal Crypt, despite her not being a Catholic. She was placed in a separate chamber within the crypt and still rests there as of 2022, now in a more central place.

Third marriage 
After his two tragic marriages and in a grave economic and political climate, Archduke Joseph wished to marry for a third time. Looking for a companion in his everyday problems, he chose twenty-two-year-old Duchess Maria Dorothea of Württemberg, daughter of Duke Louis of Württemberg and Princess Henriette of Nassau-Weilburg. The former Duchy of Württemberg had been an ally of the Austrian Empire at the end of the Napoleonic Wars, which was probably why Emperor-King Francis supported the match. The couple, with an age difference of twenty-one years, married in the castle of Kirchheim unter Teck on 24 August 1829.

Maria Dorothea spent her life as nádorné with charitable work, especially supporting the Lutheran church in Hungary to which she belonged besides teachers, and schools. She founded and supported many charitable societies and institutions. She also helped Joseph in his job as palatine, especially in the fight for making Hungarian the country's official language instead of Latin. On New Year's Day 1826, she gave a speech in Hungarian, the first time a Habsburg archduchess addressed the country in its own language. Maria Dorothea actively participated in the social life of Pest, frequenting the houses of the Károlyis and the Széchenyis, with whom she largely conversed in Hungarian. On many occasions, she wore a Hungarian-style dress.

Family life 

The couple's first child, Elizabeth Caroline Henrika was born on 30 July 1820, and died twenty-three days later on 23 August. She was the first person to be buried in the Palatinal Crypt, without embalming or much ceremony. According to her death certificate, she died of 'internal hydrocephalus' ('inneren Wasserkopfe'), and a later investigation found signs supporting this claim, besides determining that she had been born prematurely. Their next child, Alexander Leopold Ferdinand was born on 6 June 1825. He was described as a kind and clever little boy, who was in great health. In November 1837, aged twelve, he started to suffer from diarrhea and soon showed symptoms of scarlet fever. It is unclear what caused his death; it could be complications of scarlet fever or, more likely, a mysterious infectious disease appearing from time to time during the century which consisted of recurrent fever, jaundice, and strong sweating. Hepatitis, paratyphoid fever, and typhoid fever have also been suggested. The child was buried silently in the Palatinal Crypt.

The three youngest children, Elisabeth, Joseph Karl, and Marie Henriette survived to adulthood. Maria Dorothea also raised her two step-children, and Joseph especially adored the older twin, Hermine, a favourite of Hungarian high society. She died unexpectedly in 1842, aged only twenty-five, and was greatly mourned by all, but especially her devastated father.

After Joseph's death in 1847, Maria Dorothea lived for the rest of her life in Alcsút Palace and did not play a significant role in culture or politics. She died after an illness on 30 March 1855, at the age of fifty-eight, and was buried in the Palatinal Crypt on 4 April.

Death and legacy 
In September 1845, the archduke celebrated the fiftieth anniversary of his appointment to Hungary, and the next year marked the same for his palatinate. By then, he was in ill health and he became bedridden in early October 1846. The press reported on his recovery, and he was well for some time, but he felt the need to secure the governorship for his elder son Stephen upon his death. On 11 January 1847, he took extreme unction and received Stephen, who brought news of his sister Elisabeth's engagement, which delighted their father. Then, they conversed about the state of their family and Hungary, with the palatine giving advice to his son and successor on both. In the end, he exclaimed that he would want to do a few more things in Hungary, commanding Stephen do to 'what [his] hands can no longer do'.

On 12 January, he asked to be taken to the window to look at Pest, by now a capital city with a hundred thousand inhabitants. His doctors reported on his health three times a day to the public, writing of an 'incessant decline of vitality and the accumulation of calamitous symptoms', which did not 'allow any comforting report to be made'. Kept awake by constant hiccups, he slept little and his speech was hard to understand. On 13 January at dawn, he blessed his children one last time before dying at nine in the morning, aged seventy-one.

Following an autopsy, the late archduke's body was embalmed, and he lay in state until his burial on 18 January. He was interred in the Palatinal Crypt wearing díszmagyar, and the cause of his death was given as 'paralysis intestinorum', intestinal paralysis. After grave robbers had disturbed the body, a medical investigation into the remains determined that he indeed died of paralysis and a consequent circulatory shock, but the specific diagnosis remains unknown. One proposed disorder which could lead to the symptoms displayed by the palatine was prostate enlargement.

Archduke Joseph's son Stephen was elected the next (and last) nádor, while Joseph was honoured as one who had been 'born a Habsburg but died a Hungarian'. Many eulogised him, among them his then-ruling nephew Emperor-King Ferdinand I/V, who called him a 'most valued advisor who had always guarded the constitution of Hungary with vigilant care', and Lajos Kossuth, who depicted him as a patriarch whom all parties and factions respected. The first law of 1847–48 officially enshrined his memory as that of one who had 'deserved the gratitude of the nation entirely' with his 'untiring zeal' in guiding the affairs of Hungary for half a century under difficult circumstances. On 25 April 1869, his statue by Johann Halbig was unveiled in the presence of the then-ruling imperial and royal couple, Franz Joseph I and Elisabeth, a demonstration of their trust and love of Hungary following the Austro-Hungarian Compromise of 1867.

Issue 
Archduke Joseph had eight children from three marriages: five daughters and three sons. Two daughters died in infancy and a further one in childhood. His three surviving children from her last marriage married and had issue, Archduke Joseph Karl continuing the Hungarian or Palatinal branch of the House of Habsburg-Lorraine, which had been founded by his father. His older son Stephen became the last palatine of Hungary, his term cut short after less than a year by the Hungarian Revolution of 1848. One of his daughters, Marie Henriette became queen consort of the Belgians and the mother of Crown Princess Stéphanie of Austria.

His children were:

 by Grand Duchess Alexandra Pavlovna of Russia (born 1783, married 1799, died 1801):
 Archduchess Paulina/Alexandra of Austria (8 March 1801, Buda, Kingdom of Hungary);
 by Princess Hermine Amalie Marie of Anhalt-Bernburg-Schaumburg-Hoym (born 1797, married 1815, died 1817):
 Archduchess Hermine Amalie Marie of Austria (14 September 1817, Buda – 13 February 1842, Vienna, Austrian Empire), princess-abbess of the Theresian Institution of Noble Ladies between 1835 and 1842, never married and had no issue;
 Archduke Stephen Francis Victor of Austria (14 September 1817, Buda – 19 February 1867, Menton, France), palatine of Hungary between 1847 and 1848, never married and had no issue;
by Duchess Maria Dorothea Louisa Wilhelmina Carolina of Württemberg (born 1797, married 1819, widowed 1847, died 1855):
Archduchess Elizabeth Caroline Henrika of Austria (30 July 1820, Buda – 23 August 1820, Buda), died in infancy;
Archduke Alexander Leopold Ferdinand of Austria (6 June 1825, Buda – 12 November 1837, Buda), died in childhood;
Archduchess Elisabeth Franziska Maria of Austria (17 January 1831, Buda – 14 February 1903, Vienna) married first her second cousin Archduke Ferdinand Karl Viktor of Austria-Este (1821–1849) in 1847 and had issue and second her first cousin Archduke Karl Ferdinand of Austria (1818–1874) in 1854 and had issue;
Archduke Joseph Karl Ludwig of Austria (2 March 1833, Pozsony – 13 June 1905, Fiume, Kingdom of Croatia-Slavonia) major general in the Austro-Hungarian Army, married Princess Clotilde of Saxe-Coburg and Gotha (1846–1927) in 1864 and had issue;
Archduchess Marie Henriette Anne of Austria (23 August 1836, Buda – 19 September 1902, Spa, Belgium), queen consort of the Belgians as the wife of King Leopold II (1835–1909), married in 1853 and had issue, including Crown Princess Stéphanie of Austria (1864–1945);
 By an unknown woman:
 Gavio Clùtos (2 March 1810 – January 1859).

Honours

 : Grand Cross of the Southern Cross
 :
 Knight of the Golden Fleece (1790)
 Grand Cross of St. Stephen, in Diamonds (1794)
 Gold Civil Cross of Honour (1813/14)
 
 Knight of the Black Eagle, 14 August 1844
 Knight of the Red Eagle, 1st Class
 
 Order of Saint Andrew (1798)

Ancestry

References

Bibliography

External links 

 Collection of links to books and articles on Archduke Joseph, Palatine of Hungary (in Hungarian)

1776 births
1847 deaths
Sons of emperors
Austrian princes
House of Habsburg-Lorraine
Palatines of Hungary
Knights of the Golden Fleece of Austria
Grand Crosses of the Order of Saint Stephen of Hungary
Members of the Hungarian Academy of Sciences
Generals of the Holy Roman Empire
Burials at Palatinal Crypt
Children of Leopold II, Holy Roman Emperor
Sons of kings